The 2002 Thomas & Uber Cup was held in Guangzhou, China from May 9 to May 19, 2002. It was the 22nd tournament of World Men's Team Badminton Championships of Thomas Cup and 19th tournament of World Women's Team Badminton Championships of Uber Cup.

It is the only Thomas & Uber Cup that was played in a 7 points / 5 sets scoring system.

Indonesia won the Thomas Cup for the fifth time in a row and China won the Uber Cup for the third time in a row.

Host city selection
Hong Kong, Bangkok, Singapore, Jakarta, Kuala Lumpur, New Delhi and Tokyo were among the cities interested to host the events. However, after a long discussion with Chinese Badminton Association, Guangzhou was confirmed as host in January 2002.

Teams
The following nations from 2 continents, shown by region, qualified for the 2002 Thomas & Uber Cup. Of the 11 nations, defending champions of Thomas Cup, Indonesia, and host nation as well as defending champion of Uber Cup, China and its Thomas Cup team qualified automatically and did not play the qualification round.

Thomas & Uber Cup
 China
 Denmark
 Germany
 Indonesia
 Korea

Thomas Cup
 Malaysia
 Thailand
 Sweden

Uber Cup
 Hong Kong
 Japan
 Netherlands

Thomas Cup

Groups

Group A

May 9, 2002

May 11, 2002

May 14, 2002

Group B

May 10, 2002

May 12, 2002

May 14, 2002

Knockout stages

Semi-finals

Final

Uber Cup

Groups

Group A

May 9, 2002

May 11, 2002

May 13, 2002

Group B

May 10, 2002

May 12, 2002

May 13, 2002

Knockout stages

Semi-finals

Final

References

Smash: 2002 Thomas Cup - Final Round

External links
 Mike's Badminton Populorum - Uber Cup
 Mike's Badminton Populorum - Thomas Cup 

Thomas Uber Cup
Thomas and Uber Cup
Thomas & Uber Cup
Badminton tournaments in China